Vermont Route 144 (VT 144) is a  east–west state highway in Rutland County, Vermont, United States. It extends from VT 22A in Benson to VT 30 in Sudbury. VT 144 also passes through the extreme northwestern corner of Hubbardton. All of VT 144 is town-maintained.

Route description
Route 144 begins in the west at an intersection with Route 22A east of Benson.  The route follows a generally east-northeast track as it heads out of Benson, crossing into Sudbury and ending at an intersection with Route 30 south of town.  Route 144 runs through an isolated area, intersecting one relatively major local road, Hortonia Road, along its length, but not intersecting any numbered routes between its endpoints. The road passes by Lake Hortonia just before ending at its eastern terminus.

Major intersections

References

External links

144
Transportation in Rutland County, Vermont